Agrinio Airport  is a military airport in Agrinio, a city in the regional unit of Aetolia-Acarnania in Greece.

References

External links
 

Agrinio
Airports in Greece
Buildings and structures in Aetolia-Acarnania
Military installations of Greece
Transport infrastructure in Western Greece